Fayçal Hamdani (born July 13, 1970 in Boufarik) is a retired Algerian international football player.

Career

Honours

Club
 USM Alger
 Ligue 1 (1): 2001-02
 Algerian Cup (3): 1997, 1999, 2001

References

External links
 web.archive.org Profile
 
 Fayçal Hamdani profile at footballdatabase.eu

1970 births
Competitors at the 1991 Mediterranean Games
Competitors at the 1993 Mediterranean Games
1996 African Cup of Nations players
1998 African Cup of Nations players
Living people
People from Boufarik
Algerian footballers
Algeria international footballers
Association football defenders
MC Alger players
USM Alger players
Mediterranean Games silver medalists for Algeria
WA Boufarik players
Mediterranean Games medalists in football
21st-century Algerian people
20th-century Algerian people